Ulva clathrata is a species of seaweed in the family Ulvaceae that can be found in such European countries as Azores, Belgium, Ireland, Netherlands, and the United Kingdom. It is also common in Asian and African countries such as Israel, Kenya, Mauritius, South Africa, Tanzania, Japan, Portugal and Tunisia. It has distribution in the Americas as well including Alaska, Argentina, Brazil, Cuba, Grenada, Hispaniola, and Venezuela. Besides various countries it can be found in certain gulfs, oceans and seas such as the Gulf of Maine and Gulf of Mexico, Indian Ocean and European waters (including Mediterranean Sea).

Description

Uses
It is used in biochemistry, since it has 20-26% content of protein, 32-36% of which are crude proteins. The plant also contains glucose (10–16%), rhamnose (36–40%), uronic acids (27–29%), and xylose (10–13%).

In other languages
The species is also known by this names in other countries:

,  or

References

External links

Ulvaceae
Plants described in 1811
Flora of Africa
Flora of Asia
Flora of Europe
Flora of North America